Pareuxoa fuscata is a moth of the family Noctuidae. It is found in the Tarapacá Region of Chile.

The wingspan is about 30 mm. Adults are on wing in November.

External links
 Noctuinae of Chile

Noctuinae
Endemic fauna of Chile